Huno Rätsep (born 28 December 1927 in Tartu) is an Estonian linguist.

In 1951 he graduated from Tartu State University. Since 1953 he has taught at the University of Tartu, since 1977, a professor.

His main fields of research have been structural linguistics and generative grammar, grammar of Estonian language.

Since 1981 he is a member of Estonian Academy of Sciences. 1982-1982 he was the chairperson of Mother Tongue Society.

Awards
 1998: Wiedemann Language Award
 2001: Order of the White Star, IV class.

Works
 Eesti keele ajalooline morfoloogia I (1977, 21982)
 Eesti keele lihtlausete tüübid (1978) 
 Eesti keele ajalooline morfoloogia II (1979)
 Sõnaloo raamat (2002)

References

Living people
1927 births
Linguists from Estonia
University of Tartu alumni
Academic staff of the University of Tartu
Recipients of the Order of the White Star, 4th Class
People from Tartu